Hilde Henriksen Waage (born 18 August 1959, in Drammen) is a Norwegian historian and peace researcher. She is Professor of History at the University of Oslo and was acting Director of Peace Research Institute Oslo from 1992 to 1993. Waage is an expert on the Israeli–Palestinian conflict and Norway–Israel relations.

Career

Waage took the Cand.philol. degree at the University of Oslo in 1987 and the Dr.philos. degree in 1997, both in history. She became a professor at the University of Oslo in 2007. Before this, Waage worked at the Peace Research Institute Oslo (PRIO), mostly as a researcher but also as acting director (September 1992 – April 1993) and deputy director (1996–2005).

Waage has produced foundational contributions to Norwegian scholarship on Norway's role in the Oslo process of Israeli-Palestinian negotiations during the early to mid-1990s. She has also been critical of the doctoral thesis of former Norwegian State Secretary Jan Egeland, who was intimately involved with the Oslo negotiations, and has used the Oslo process to demonstrate what she calls "the limits of third-party mediation by a small state in highly asymmetrical conflicts," in contradiction to Egeland's thesis.

Part of the Oslo process involved the famous back-channel negotiations, which were mediated by Norway. In 2001, Waage was commissioned by the Norwegian Ministry of Foreign Affairs (MFA) to conduct a comprehensive study of this back channel. In order to carry out the research, she was granted privileged access to all relevant, still-classified files in the ministry’s archives. The MFA had been at the heart of the Oslo process, but when Waage set to work at the archives she was surprised to discover "not a single scrap of paper for the entire period from January to September 1993—precisely the period of the backchannel talks." Such documentation does exist, and has been quoted by Israeli accounts of the Oslo process, but attempts to uncover it have failed, and significant amounts of documentation held by, inter alia, former Foreign Minister Johan Jørgen Holst has been refused access to. Waage and others speculate that such documentation has been kept hidden for party-political reasons, to avoid upsetting Israeli and US sensitivities about Israel's stance during the Oslo process, and for the vested interests of the Norwegian officials involved: Waage describes Norway under the guidance of Terje Rød-Larsen, his wife Mona Juul, Jan Egeland and Johan Jørgen Holst as "Israel's helpful errand boy."

Waage divides her country's role at Oslo into two phases. In the first, "the Norwegians played only the role of a very modest facilitator"; however, during the second, from May 1993 after the Israelis upgraded the status of the Oslo talks:

Waage also comments about the real power that Norway had in the meetings. She in the last paragraph of her paper "Postscript to Oslo" says that:Without the power to impose solutions, and above all dependent on the stronger party, the weak state mediator in unequal contests must rely heavily on “process symmetry,” where the two sides are treated with absolute equality, provided with exactly the same accommodations, allotted exactly the same amount of time to make their case, and so on. The Norwegians went to great lengths to achieve this symmetry (as did the Americans in their mediating efforts between Palestinians and Israelis, albeit for different reasons). The problem with process symmetry is that it cannot address the power asymmetry that inevitably distorts the outcome of negotiations. Process symmetry and the entrie [sic] facilitative exercise can create a sense of equality between adversaries and the illusion of genuine communication, even trust. The Norwegians believed that through dialogue and a gradual building of trust, an irreversible peace dynamic would be created that could push the process forward to solution. The problem with this entire approach is that the issue is not one of trust, but of power. The facilitative process masks that reality. In the end, the results that can be achieved by a weak third-party facilitator are no more than the strong party will allow. Short of unusual generosity or truly far-sighted vision, such a solution can only be unbalanced and unfair, and therefore ultimately unsustainable. The question to be asked is whether such a model can ever be appropriate.

Critics
Waage was criticized both by With Israel for Peace and in Twitter for her moderate approach of how security forces should deal with terrorists.

Selected bibliography
 
 
 
 
 
 
 
 
 
 
 (1996): Norge -Israels beste venn. Norsk Midtøsten-politikk 1949-1956. Universitetsforlaget.   (p. 30-45: Yanuv)

References

1959 births
Living people
21st-century Norwegian historians
University of Oslo alumni
Academic staff of the University of Oslo
People from Drammen
Norwegian women academics
Norwegian women historians